The Enemy is a 1927 American silent drama film directed by Fred Niblo and starring Lillian Gish, Ralph Forbes and Ralph Emerson. The film was thought to have been lost for years until a copy was discovered at the MGM library, now owned by Turner Entertainment. However, the film is still missing its final reel. Actor Joel McCrea made an early appearance as an extra.

Plot
Newlywed Carl (Ralph Forbes) goes to war where he endures major suffering. Back home, wife Pauli (Lillian Gish) starves, becomes a prostitute to survive, and their baby dies.

Cast
 Lillian Gish as Pauli Arndt
 Ralph Forbes as Carl Behrend
 Ralph Emerson as Bruce Gordon
 Frank Currier as Professor Arndt
 George Fawcett as August Bejremd
 Fritzi Ridgeway as Mitzi Winkelmann
 Hans Joby as Fritz Winkelmann (credited as John S. Peters)
 Karl Dane as Jan
 Polly Moran as Baruska
 Billy Kent Schaefer as Kurt
 Louise Emmons (uncredited)
 Betty Jane Graham as Little girl (uncredited)
 Joel McCrea as Extra (uncredited)

Censorship concern
The Motion Picture Producers and Distributors of America, formed by the film industry in 1922, regulated the content of films through a list of subjects that were to be avoided. While Lillian Gish portrayed a prostitute in The Enemy, this was acceptable as prostitution was not explicitly barred so long as it was not forced (i.e., white slavery) and aspects of her work were not shown in the film.

See also
 List of American films of 1927
 Lillian Gish filmography 
 List of incomplete or partially lost films

References

External links

Stills as silentfilmstillarchive.com

1927 films
1927 drama films
1920s rediscovered films
Silent American drama films
American silent feature films
American black-and-white films
Films directed by Fred Niblo
Films set on the Austro-Hungarian home front during World War I
Films set in Austria
Metro-Goldwyn-Mayer films
Rediscovered American films
1920s American films
Silent war films